JZR may refer to:

 ICAO designator of Jazeera Airways, a Kuwaiti airline
 JZR Trikes, a UK producer of trikes